This is a list of the species that inhabit the Northwestern Hawaiian Islands. Except for researchers and volunteers living on Midway Atoll, Kure Atoll, and Tern Island, the leeward islands are uninhabited by people but home to at least 7000 species ranging from marine mammals, fish, sea turtles, birds and invertebrates. Many of these species are rare or endangered and at least 25% are endemic to the Northwestern Hawaiian Islands. This list identifies which islands the species lives on, and whether the species is endemic to the NWHI.

Animals

Birds

Plants

References

External links 

Northwestern
Northwestern
Northwestern Hawaiian Islands